The DTA Feeling is a French ultralight trike, designed and produced by DTA sarl of Montélimar. The aircraft is supplied complete and ready-to-fly.

Design and development
The aircraft has a great deal of parts commonality with the DTA Evolution, but includes a cockpit fairing, windshield, panniers, and a standard instrumentation package. It features a cable-braced hang glider-style DTA Diva high-wing, weight-shift controls, a two-seats-in-tandem open cockpit, tricycle landing gear with wheel pants and a single engine in pusher configuration.

The aircraft is made from bolted-together aluminum tubing, with its double surface wing covered in Dacron sailcloth. Its  span wing is supported by a single tube-type kingpost and uses an "A" frame weight-shift control bar. The powerplant is a twin cylinder, liquid-cooled, two-stroke, dual-ignition  Rotax 582 engine, with the four cylinder, air and liquid-cooled, four-stroke, dual-ignition  Rotax 912 or  Rotax 912S engines optional.

A number of different wings can be fitted to the basic carriage as well as the Diva wing, including the DTA Dynamic, and the strut-braced DTA Magic.

Specifications (Feeling 582 Diva)

References

External links

Felling
2000s French sport aircraft
2000s French ultralight aircraft
Single-engined pusher aircraft
Ultralight trikes